St. Joseph Central Catholic High School is a private Catholic high school in Huntington, West Virginia. It is part of the Diocese of Wheeling-Charleston.

Extracurricular activities
Fall
Cross country
Golf
Boys' and girls' soccer
Girls' volleyball

Winter
Girls' cheerleading
Boys' and girls' basketball
Swimming
Huntington Prep

Spring
Boys' and girls' tennis
Girls' softball
Boys' baseball
Boys' and Girls' Track

Clubs 

 Mu Alpha Theta
 National Honor Society
 Book Club
 Dead Theologians Society
 Fellowship of Christian Athletes
 Health Science Club
 Key Club
 Latin Club
 Music Ministry
 Outdoor Recreation Club
 Archery
 Sociedad Honoraria Hispanica (SHH)
 Spirit Club
 Student Council
 Students Against Destructive Decisions: SADD
 Newspaper
 Yearbook

Notable alumni
 Mike Woelfel politician
 Andrew WigginsNBA basketball player
 Thomas Bryant NBA basketball player
 Miles Bridges NBA basketball player

External links
 School website

References

Catholic secondary schools in West Virginia
Schools in Cabell County, West Virginia
Educational institutions established in 1924
Buildings and structures in Huntington, West Virginia
Roman Catholic Diocese of Wheeling-Charleston
1924 establishments in West Virginia